WZAN (970 kHz) is a commercial AM radio station broadcasting a classic country radio format.  Licensed to Portland, it is owned by Saga Communications.  The studios and offices are on Western Avenue in South Portland, Maine.

WZAN operates with 5,000 watts.  By day, the station uses a non-directional antenna but at night the signal is directional to protect other radio stations on AM 970.  The transmitter is located off Ellwood Avenue in Scarborough, Maine.  WZAN's programming is also broadcast on FM translator W268CS at 101.5 MHz in Portland.

History

The station was originally WCSH, "The Voice from Sunrise Land."  It was based at the Congress Square Hotel, from which it got its call sign.  It was the first station in Portland, and one of the earliest in Maine, signing on the air on July 13, 1925.  WCSH was a charter affiliate of the NBC Red Network.  It carried NBC's schedule of dramas, comedies, news, sports, soap operas, game shows and big band broadcasts during the "Golden Age of Radio."

In the 1930s, WCSH broadcast on 940 kilocycles, at 2,500 watts by day and 1,000 watts at night.  With the enactment of North American Regional Broadcasting Agreement (NARBA) in 1941, WCSH shifted to 970 kHz.  The power was boosted to 5,000 watts around the clock.

In 1953, WCSH gained a sister station when Channel 6 WCSH-TV debuted.  Because 970 was an NBC affiliate, Channel 6 also carried NBC TV shows. As network programming shifted from radio to television, WCSH 970 switched to a full service, middle of the road format of popular music, news and sports.

From 1975 to 1977, 970 WCSH was a full time affiliate of NBC Radio's News And Information Service.  WCSH continued as an all-news radio station on its own for several years after NIS was discontinued. In the 1980s, WCSH began simulcasting co-owned 100.9 WYNZ-FM using the call letters WYNZ.

In 1993, WYNZ-AM-FM were bought by Saga Communications for $350,000.  AM 970 flipped to a hot talk format.  It changed its call sign to WZAN to echo co-owned talk radio station 560 WGAN.  The new format included syndicated wake up host Imus in the Morning until Don Imus' controversial statements about the Rutgers University women's basketball team in 2007.  Also carried were Don & Mike, The Bob & Tom Show, Lex and Terry, NASCAR racing from Motor Racing Network and NFL football from Westwood One.

In March 2009, the station ended its hot talk format.  It changed programming to a more political base with Imus in The Morning re-added to the schedule.  In addition, syndicated programs from Sean Hannity, Dave Ramsey and Laura Ingraham were put on the schedule.
 
Starting January 1, 2016, WZAN's talk programming was shifted to co-owned 1490 WBAE.  WZAN became a sports radio station, using the programming of the ESPN Radio Network.  A couple of years later, an FM translator was added at 101.5 MHz so listeners in Portland and its adjacent suburbs could hear WZAN on either AM or FM radio.

On November 1, 2019, WZAN changed their format from ESPN sports to classic country, branded as "101.5 The Outlaw".

Translator

Previous logo

References

External links

Classic country radio stations in the United States
Radio stations established in 1925
ZAN